I'm Your Girl is the debut studio album by South Korean girl group S.E.S., released by SM Entertainment on November 1, 1997. It spawned two singles: "('Cause) I'm Your Girl", which was promoted shortly after the release of the album, and "Oh, My Love", which was released in March 1998. Commercially, I'm Your Girl sold approximately 650,000 copies.

Release and promotion
S.E.S. is one of South Korea's first generation K-pop idol groups. Under SM Entertainment's management, it was produced wholly by Lee Soo-man. Its original release was on King Records with subsequent releases by Synnara Records. 

The lead single, title track "I'm Your Girl" features rapping by Eric Mun and Andy Lee prior to their debut with Shinhwa. The music video remained one of the most requested ones on popular music shows for 13 to 14 weeks. It collected four music show wins on the programs Live Young Times and Inkigayo. In 2001, the song was included on SM Entertainment's compilation album, SM Best Album 2. It was also included on their 2003 Japanese release of Korean songs, Beautiful Songs. A remixed version, featuring Japanese rapper Kreva, then a member of Kick the Can Crew, was included on the group's second single in Japan.

A second single, "Oh, My Love", was released in March 1998. It achieved the top spot on Inkigayo on April 12, 1998.

Reception
The album sold steadily over time. In total, it sold approximately 650,000 physical copies. According to MTV Korea, "I'm Your Girl" "quickly became the Korean schoolgirl anthem, and remains a staple song for young girls in love." It has been performed on television by modern idol groups such as Girls' Generation, and a parody version of its music video was created by boy group Exo.

Track listing

Notes 
 "('Cause) I'm Your Girl" features uncredited rap vocals from Andy Lee and Eric Mun.
 "Thy Fragrance" features Eric Mun despite no credit given, and is a remake of the 1995 song with the same title by Yoo Young-jin.

Sales

Accolades

References

External links 
  S.E.S.' official site 

1997 debut albums
S.E.S. (group) albums
SM Entertainment albums